Dark Eye(s) or The Dark Eye may refer to:

Film, television, theater, and audio drama 
 Dark Eyes (play), a 1943 play by Elena Miramova in collaboration with Eugenie Leontovich
 Dark Eyes (1987 film), an Italian and Russian-language film
 Dark Eyes (1951 film) (Schwarze Augen), a German film starring Cornell Borchers
 Dark Eyes (TV series), a 1995 series pilot featuring Roy Dupuis
 Dark Eyes (audio drama), a 2012 Doctor Who audio drama starring Paul McGann
 Dark Eyes (1935 film), a 1935 French drama film

Games 
 The Dark Eye, a German role-playing system
 The Dark Eye (video game), a 1995 horror computer game
 The Dark Eye: Demonicon, a 2013 fantasy-themed role-playing video game
 Dark Eyes (video game), a game for Windows developed by Nextech

Literature 
 Dark Eye: The Films of David Fincher (born 1962), 2003 book about David Fincher
 Dark Eye, a 2005 novel by William Bernhardt

Music 
 "Dark Eyes" (Russian song), an 1843 song often performed in concerts of gypsy music
 "Dark Eyes" (Bob Dylan song), from Empire Burlesque
 Dark Eyes (Tomasz Stańko album), 2009
 Dark Eyes (Half Moon Run album), 2012
 Dark Adapted Eye, a 1988 compilation album by Danielle Dax

See also 
 Eye color
 Dark (disambiguation)
 
 
 Black Eyes (disambiguation)